Saltepe can refer to:

 Saltepe, Çermik
 Saltepe, Hınıs